Mosillus tibialis is a species of shore flies in the family Ephydridae.

Distribution
Canada, United States, Bahamas, Mexico, Hawaiian Islands.

References

Ephydridae
Insects described in 1916
Diptera of Asia
Diptera of North America
Taxa named by Ezra Townsend Cresson